Black pacu is a common name for several fishes and may refer to:

Colossoma macropomum
Myleus schomburgkii
Piaractus brachypomus